The Zimbabwe national basketball team is the national basketball team representing Zimbabwe. It is administrated by the Basketball Union of Zimbabwe (BUZ).

Squad                                                                                                                                                                                                                                 Guards- Williams Goon (starter), Simba Mungomezi (starter),Tinotenda Mugabe, Moses Muyambo, Duncan Shenje, Tatenda Maturure                                                                                                                                                                                                                      Forwards- Eric Banda (starter)

The Zimbabweans have qualified for the African Basketball Championship twice.

Competitions

Performance at Summer Olympics
yet to qualify

Performance at World championships
yet to qualify

Performance at FIBA Africa Championship

Performance at the All African Games

1985 - First round
1995 - First round

References

External links
Zimbabwe Basketball Records at FIBA Archive
Africabasket – Zimbabwe Men National Team
Presentation on Facebook

Men's national basketball teams
Basketball
Basketball in Zimbabwe
1962 establishments in Southern Rhodesia